Patricia Amelia Vaka (born 17 May 1986) is a New Zealand Professional Rugby Union Player and professional boxer.

In 2019, the Northland Women's Rugby team known as the Northland Kauri made their debut in the Women's Provincial Championship, now known as the Farah Palmer Cup. Vaka was named one of the original founding players for Northland in the Championships. In the three times that Northland reach the semi finals of the Farah Palmer Cup, Vaka has played in two of those semi finals. All three semi finals were against Hawkes Bay.

As a professional boxer, she has fought some of the worlds best heavyweight boxers including Retired WBO Light Heavyweight champion Geovana Peres and world title contender Lani Daniels.

Rugby Union

Kaikohe Rugby 
In 2022, Vaka played four games for the Kaikohe Women's rugby team, with one bye and a game that was deemed a draw, however did not take place due to covid. Vaka scored one try within the first minute against HH Women Rugby Team. Kaikohe won one out of the four games of the season.

Northland Kauri 
In 2019, Northland reached the semi finals, playing against Hawkes Bay. Vaka was named the number 4 for the game. Hawkes Bay won the game with a score of 46 - 31.

In 2020, Vaka was named in the Northland Kauri team, however the team did not reach the finals this year.

On 20 August 2022, Vaka played for Northland against Taranaki at TET Stadium & Events Centre. 56 minutes and 35 seconds into the game, Vaka scored her first try of her Farah Palmer Cup Career. Northland won the game by 29 - 15. In September 2022, Northland Reached the Semi Finals, playing against Hawkes Bay for the third time. Vaka was named the number 2 for the game. Hawkes Bay won the game with a score of 28 - 19.

Boxing 

On 1 September 2017, Vaka made her professional boxing debut against Lani Daniels. Daniels won the fight by unanimous decision. In her third fight of her professional career, Vaka took on Geovana Peres for the vacant New Zealand National (PBCNZ version) Light Heavyweight title. Peres won the fight by unanimous decision. In November 2017, Vaka took on Daniels in a rematch for the vacant New Zealand National (NZPBA version) Light Heavyweight title. Daniels won the fight by Unanimous Decision. In August 2018, Vaka made her Australian debut when she took on undefeated Natalie Jenkinson. Vaka received her first victory of her professional boxing career, winning the fight by 2nd-round knockout. After the fight she receive a ranking of 8th in the world on Boxrec. In December 2018, Vaka took on Peres in a rematch. This was a fight before Peres went on to win the World Light Heavyweight title. Peres won the fight by unanimous decision. Despite her loss, she still maintained a ranking of 10th on Boxrec. In November 2019, Vaka fought on the Geovana Peres vs. Claire Hafner world title undercard making her New Zealand television debut. She took on undefeated Australian boxer Desley Robinson. Robinson won the fight by Unanimous Decision. Outside of competing, Vaka is a boxing professional trainer.

Professional boxing record

Awards and recognitions 
 2018 Northland Sports Award Female Boxer of the Year (Nominated)
 2018 Northland Sports Award Fireco Sportswomen of the Year (Nominated)
 2018 Far North Sports Awards ASB Boxing Code Award (Won)

Personal life 
Vaka is of Māori descent, and affiliates to Ngāpuhi.

References

External links
 
 Club Rugby Profile

1986 births
Living people
New Zealand women boxers
New Zealand Māori sportspeople
New Zealand female rugby union players
Rugby union players from the Northland Region
Northland rugby union players
Sportspeople from the Northland Region
Ngāpuhi people
Boxers from Northland
Light-heavyweight boxers
Middleweight boxers